Richardsiella is a genus of plants in the grass family. The only known species in this genus is Richardsiella eruciformis, native to the Democratic Republic of the Congo and Zambia.

References

External links
 An isotype photo with the collectors' identification can be found here. The tagging reads, in part, "Abercorn district, Chilongowelo, open ground path to 'Plain of Death', in sandy soil; Alt. 4,800 ft.; 1955 [the collection year]

Chloridoideae
Grasses of Africa
Flora of the Democratic Republic of the Congo
Flora of Zambia
Monotypic Poaceae genera